Tommy Schmid (born 12 April 1988) is a Swiss Nordic combined skier who has been competing since 2005. At the 2010 Winter Olympics in Vancouver, he finished ninth in the 4 x 5 km team, 16th in the 10 km individual large hill, and 40th in the individual large hill events.

Schmid best World Cup finish was second in 7.5 km sprint event in Poland in 2008.

References

Official website

1988 births
Living people
Nordic combined skiers at the 2010 Winter Olympics
Olympic Nordic combined skiers of Switzerland
Swiss male Nordic combined skiers
Universiade medalists in nordic combined
Universiade gold medalists for Switzerland
Universiade bronze medalists for Switzerland
Competitors at the 2011 Winter Universiade